Cochylis aestiva is a species of moth of the family Tortricidae. It is found in northern Syria.

References

Moths described in 1900
Cochylis